River Street Historic District is a national historic district located at Wilkes-Barre, Pennsylvania. The district includes 215 contributing buildings built between 1860 and 1930, which include notable examples of the Beaux Arts and Gothic Revival styles. Many of the contributing dwellings incorporate Wyoming Bluestone into the foundations and dressings. It was added to the National Register of Historic Places in 1985.

Description 
The River Street Historic District is a national historic district located at Wilkes-Barre, Luzerne County, Pennsylvania. The district includes 215 contributing buildings near downtown in Wilkes-Barre on Franklin St., River St., W. River St., W. Jackson St., W. Union St., W. Market St., W. Northampton St., W. South St., and W. Ross, St., and Barnum Pl. The buildings were built between 1860 and 1930, and include notable examples of the Beaux Arts and Gothic Revival styles. Many of the contributing dwellings incorporate Wyoming Bluestone into the foundations and dressings.

Notable buildings include the S.L. Brown Home (1840s, 1886), George Bedford House (1875), former Presbyterian Church now Osterhout Library (1843–1852), "new" Presbyterian Church (1889), St. Stephen's Episcopal Pro-Cathedral (1897), Penn Bank Building (1911), First Eastern Building (1907), and Y.M.C.A. (1930).

References 

Historic districts on the National Register of Historic Places in Pennsylvania
Historic districts in Luzerne County, Pennsylvania
National Register of Historic Places in Luzerne County, Pennsylvania